The Xerox NoteTaker is a portable computer developed at Xerox PARC in Palo Alto, California, in 1978. Although it did not enter production, and only around ten prototypes were built, it strongly influenced the design of the later Osborne 1 and Compaq Portable computers.

Development
The NoteTaker was developed by a team that included Adele Goldberg, Douglas Fairbairn, and Larry Tesler. It drew heavily on earlier research by Alan Kay, who had previously developed the Dynabook project. While the Dynabook was a concept for a transportable computer that was impossible to implement with available technology, the NoteTaker was intended to show what could be done.

Description
The computer employed what was then highly advanced technology, including a built-in monochrome display monitor, a floppy disk drive and a mouse. It had 256 KB of RAM, then a very large amount, and used a 5 MHz Intel 8086 CPU. It used a version of the Smalltalk operating system that was originally written for the Xerox Alto computer, which pioneered the graphical user interface.

The NoteTaker fitted into a case similar in form to that of a portable sewing machine; the keyboard folded out from the bottom to reveal the monitor and floppy drive. The form factor was later used on the highly successful "luggable" computers, including the Osborne 1 and Compaq Portable.

See also
 IBM 5100
 Osborne 1
 Kaypro
 Compaq Portable
 Portable Computers

References

External links 
Firmware - memos - schematics for NoteTaker

Early laptops
Mobile computers
Portable computers
NoteTaker
Prototypes